Hawking radiation is theoretical black body radiation that is theorized to be released outside a black hole's event horizon because of relativistic quantum effects. It is named after the physicist Stephen Hawking, who developed a theoretical argument for its existence in 1974.  Hawking radiation is a purely kinematic effect that is generic to Lorentzian geometries containing event horizons or local apparent horizons.

Hawking radiation reduces the mass and rotational energy of black holes and is therefore also theorized to cause black hole evaporation. Because of this, black holes that do not gain mass through other means are expected to shrink and ultimately vanish. For all except the smallest black holes, this would happen extremely slowly. The radiation temperature is inversely proportional to the black hole's mass, so micro black holes are predicted to be larger emitters of radiation than larger black holes and should dissipate faster.

Overview 

Black holes are astrophysical objects of interest primarily because of their compact size and immense gravitational attraction. They were first predicted by Einstein's 1915 theory of general relativity, before astrophysical evidence began to mount half a century later.

A black hole can form when enough matter or energy is compressed into a volume small enough that the escape velocity is greater than the speed of light. Nothing can travel that fast, so nothing within a certain distance, proportional to the mass of the black hole, can escape beyond that distance. The region beyond which not even light can escape is the event horizon; an observer outside it cannot observe, become aware of, or be affected by events within the event horizon. The essence of a black hole is its event horizon, a theoretical demarcation between events and their causal relationships.

Alternatively, using a set of infalling coordinates in general relativity, one can conceptualize the event horizon as the region beyond which space is infalling faster than the speed of light. (Although nothing can travel through space faster than light, space itself can infall at any speed.)  Once matter is inside the event horizon, all of the matter inside falls inexorably into a gravitational singularity, a place of infinite curvature and zero size, leaving behind a warped spacetime devoid of any matter. A classical black hole is pure empty spacetime, and the simplest (nonrotating and uncharged) is characterized just by its mass and event horizon.

Our current understandings of quantum physics can be used to investigate what may happen in the region around the event horizon. In 1974, British physicist Stephen Hawking used quantum field theory in curved spacetime to show that in theory, the antimatter and matter fields were, instead of cancelling each other out normally, disrupted by the black hole, causing antimatter and matter particles to "blip" into existence as a result of the imbalanced matter fields, and drawing energy from the disruptor itself: the black holes (to escape), effectively draining energy from the black hole. In addition, not all of the particles were close to the event horizon, and the ones that were could not escape. In effect this energy acted as if the black hole itself was slowly evaporating (although it actually came from outside it).

An important difference between the black hole radiation as computed by Hawking and thermal radiation emitted from a black body is that the latter is statistical in nature, and only its average satisfies what is known as Planck's law of black-body radiation, while the former fits the data better. Thus, thermal radiation contains information about the body that emitted it, while Hawking radiation seems to contain no such information, and depends only on the mass, angular momentum, and charge of the black hole (the no-hair theorem). This leads to the black hole information paradox.

However, according to the conjectured gauge-gravity duality (also known as the AdS/CFT correspondence), black holes in certain cases (and perhaps in general) are equivalent to solutions of quantum field theory at a non-zero temperature. This means that no information loss is expected in black holes (since the theory permits no such loss) and the radiation emitted by a black hole is probably the usual thermal radiation. If this is correct, then Hawking's original calculation should be corrected, though it is not known how (see below).

A black hole of one solar mass has a temperature of only 60 nanokelvins (60 billionths of a kelvin); in fact, such a black hole would absorb far more cosmic microwave background radiation than it emits.

Formulation 

Hawking's discovery followed a visit to Moscow in 1973, where Soviet scientists Yakov Zel'dovich and Alexei Starobinsky convinced him that rotating black holes ought to create and emit particles. Even still, Russian physicist Vladimir Gribov believed that even a non-rotating black hole should emit radiation.  Hawking would find this to be true once he did the calculation himself. In 1972, Jacob Bekenstein conjectured that the black holes should have an entropy, where by the same year, he proposed no-hair theorems. Bekenstein's discovery and results are commended by Stephen Hawking, leading him to think about radiation due to this formalism.

According to the physicist Dmitri Diakonov, there was an argument between Zeldovich and Vladimir Gribov at the Zeldovich Moscow 1972–1973 seminar. Zeldovich believed that only a rotating black hole could emit radiation, while Gribov believed that even a non-rotating black hole emits radiation due to the laws of quantum mechanics. This account is confirmed by Gribov's obituary in the Physics-Uspekhi by Vitaly Ginzburg and others.

Emission process
Hawking radiation is dependent on the Unruh effect and the equivalence principle applied to black-hole horizons. Close to the event horizon of a black hole, a local observer must accelerate to keep from falling in. An accelerating observer sees a thermal bath of particles that pop out of the local acceleration horizon, turn around, and free-fall back in. The condition of local thermal equilibrium implies that the consistent extension of this local thermal bath has a finite temperature at infinity, which implies that some of these particles emitted by the horizon are not reabsorbed and become outgoing Hawking radiation.

A Schwarzschild black hole has a metric
 

The black hole is the background spacetime for a quantum field theory.

The field theory is defined by a local path integral, so if the boundary conditions at the horizon are determined, the state of the field outside will be specified. To find the appropriate boundary conditions, consider a stationary observer just outside the horizon at position
 

The local metric to lowest order is
 
The metric describes a frame that is accelerating to keep from falling into the black hole.

The horizon is not a special boundary, and objects can fall in. So the local observer should feel accelerated in ordinary Minkowski space by the principle of equivalence. The near-horizon observer must see the field excited at a local temperature
 
which is the Unruh effect.

The gravitational redshift is given by the square root of the time component of the metric. So for the field theory state to consistently extend, there must be a thermal background everywhere with the local temperature redshift-matched to the near horizon temperature:

 

 

 

Thus a field theory defined on a black-hole background is in a thermal state whose temperature at infinity is

 

From the black-hole temperature, it is straightforward to calculate the black-hole entropy . The change in entropy when a quantity of heat  is added is

 

The heat energy that enters serves to increase the total mass, so

 

The radius of a black hole is twice its mass in Planck units, so the entropy of a black hole is proportional to its surface area:

 

Assuming that a small black hole has zero entropy, the integration constant is zero. Forming a black hole is the most efficient way to compress mass into a region, and this entropy is also a bound on the information content of any sphere in space time. The form of the result strongly suggests that the physical description of a gravitating theory can be somehow encoded onto a bounding surface.

Black hole evaporation
When particles escape, the black hole loses a small amount of its energy and therefore some of its mass (mass and energy are related by Einstein's equation ). Consequently, an evaporating black hole will have a finite lifespan. By dimensional analysis, the life span of a black hole can be shown to scale as the cube of its initial mass, and Hawking estimated that any black hole formed in the early universe with a mass of less than approximately 1015 g would have evaporated completely by the present day.

In 1976, Don Page refined this estimate by calculating the power produced, and the time to evaporation, for a non-rotating, non-charged Schwarzschild black hole of mass . The time for the event horizon or entropy of a black hole to halve is known as the Page time. The calculations are complicated by the fact that a black hole, being of finite size, is not a perfect black body; the absorption cross section goes down in a complicated, spin-dependent manner as frequency decreases, especially when the wavelength becomes comparable to the size of the event horizon. Writing in 1976, Page using the understanding of neutrinos at the time erroneously worked on the assumption that neutrinos have no mass and that only two neutrino flavors exist, and therefore his results of black hole lifetimes do not match the modern results which take into account 3 flavors of neutrinos with nonzero masses.

If black holes evaporate under Hawking radiation, a solar mass black hole will evaporate over 1064 years which is vastly longer than the age of the universe. Some monster black holes in the universe are predicted to continue to grow up to perhaps 1014  during the collapse of superclusters of galaxies. Even these would evaporate over a timescale of up to 2 × 10106 years.

The power emitted by a black hole in the form of Hawking radiation can be estimated for the simplest case of a nonrotating, non-charged Schwarzschild black hole of mass . Combining the formulas for the Schwarzschild radius of the black hole, the Stefan–Boltzmann law of blackbody radiation, the above formula for the temperature of the radiation, and the formula for the surface area of a sphere (the black hole's event horizon), several equations can be derived.

The Hawking radiation temperature is:

The Bekenstein–Hawking luminosity of a black hole, under the assumption of pure photon emission (i.e. that no other particles are emitted) and under the assumption that the horizon is the radiating surface is:

It is worth mentioning that the above formula has not yet been derived in the framework of semiclassical gravity.

The time that the black hole takes to dissipate is:

This is why some astronomers are searching for signs of exploding primordial black holes.

However, since the universe contains the cosmic microwave background radiation, in order for the black hole to dissipate, the black hole must have a temperature greater than that of the present-day blackbody radiation of the universe of 2.7 K. A study suggests that  must be less than 0.8% of the mass of the Earth – approximately the mass of the Moon.

Black hole evaporation has several significant consequences:
 Black hole evaporation produces a more consistent view of black hole thermodynamics by showing how black holes interact thermally with the rest of the universe.
 Unlike most objects, a black hole's temperature increases as it radiates away mass. The rate of temperature increase is exponential, with the most likely endpoint being the dissolution of the black hole in a violent burst of gamma rays. A complete description of this dissolution requires a model of quantum gravity, however, as it occurs when the black hole's mass approaches 1 Planck mass, when its radius will also approach two Planck lengths.
 The simplest models of black hole evaporation lead to the black hole information paradox. The information content of a black hole appears to be lost when it dissipates, as under these models the Hawking radiation is random (it has no relation to the original information). A number of solutions to this problem have been proposed, including suggestions that Hawking radiation is perturbed to contain the missing information, that the Hawking evaporation leaves some form of remnant particle containing the missing information, and that information is allowed to be lost under these conditions.

Problems and extensions

Trans-Planckian problem 

The trans-Planckian problem is the issue that Hawking's original calculation includes quantum particles where the wavelength becomes shorter than the Planck length near the black hole's horizon. This is due to the peculiar behavior there, where time stops as measured from far away. A particle emitted from a black hole with a finite frequency, if traced back to the horizon, must have had an infinite frequency, and therefore a trans-Planckian wavelength.

The Unruh effect and the Hawking effect both talk about field modes in the superficially stationary spacetime that change frequency relative to other coordinates that are regular across the horizon. This is necessarily so, since to stay outside a horizon requires acceleration that constantly Doppler shifts the modes.

An outgoing photon of Hawking radiation, if the mode is traced back in time, has a frequency that diverges from that which it has at great distance, as it gets closer to the horizon, which requires the wavelength of the photon to "scrunch up" infinitely at the horizon of the black hole. In a maximally extended external Schwarzschild solution, that photon's frequency stays regular only if the mode is extended back into the past region where no observer can go. That region seems to be unobservable and is physically suspect, so Hawking used a black hole solution without a past region that forms at a finite time in the past. In that case, the source of all the outgoing photons can be identified: a microscopic point right at the moment that the black hole first formed.

The quantum fluctuations at that tiny point, in Hawking's original calculation, contain all the outgoing radiation. The modes that eventually contain the outgoing radiation at long times are redshifted by such a huge amount by their long sojourn next to the event horizon that they start off as modes with a wavelength much shorter than the Planck length. Since the laws of physics at such short distances are unknown, some find Hawking's original calculation unconvincing.

The trans-Planckian problem is nowadays mostly considered a mathematical artifact of horizon calculations. The same effect occurs for regular matter falling onto a white hole solution. Matter that falls on the white hole accumulates on it, but has no future region into which it can go. Tracing the future of this matter, it is compressed onto the final singular endpoint of the white hole evolution, into a trans-Planckian region. The reason for these types of divergences is that modes that end at the horizon from the point of view of outside coordinates are singular in frequency there. The only way to determine what happens classically is to extend in some other coordinates that cross the horizon.

There exist alternative physical pictures that give the Hawking radiation in which the trans-Planckian problem is addressed. The key point is that similar trans-Planckian problems occur when the modes occupied with Unruh radiation are traced back in time. In the Unruh effect, the magnitude of the temperature can be calculated from ordinary Minkowski field theory, and is not controversial.

Large extra dimensions
The formulas from the previous section are applicable only if the laws of gravity are approximately valid all the way down to the Planck scale. In particular, for black holes with masses below the Planck mass (~), they result in impossible lifetimes below the Planck time (~). This is normally seen as an indication that the Planck mass is the lower limit on the mass of a black hole.

In a model with large extra dimensions (10 or 11), the values of Planck constants can be radically different, and the formulas for Hawking radiation have to be modified as well. In particular, the lifetime of a micro black hole with a radius below the scale of the extra dimensions is given by equation 9 in Cheung (2002) and equations 25 and 26 in Carr (2005).

 

This formula is now consistent with black holes as light as a few TeV, with lifetimes on the order of the "new Planck time" ~.

In loop quantum gravity
A detailed study of the quantum geometry of a black hole event horizon has been made using loop quantum gravity. Loop-quantization does not reproduce the result for black hole entropy originally discovered by Bekenstein and Hawking, unless the value of a free parameter is set to cancel out various constants such that the Bekenstein–Hawking entropy formula is reproduced. However, quantum gravitational corrections to the entropy and radiation of black holes have been computed based on the theory.

Based on the fluctuations of the horizon area, a quantum black hole exhibits deviations from the Hawking radiation spectrum that would be observable were X-rays from Hawking radiation of evaporating primordial black holes to be observed. The quantum effects are centered at a set of discrete and unblended frequencies highly pronounced on top of the Hawking spectrum.

Experimental observation

Astronomical search

In June 2008, NASA launched the Fermi space telescope, which is searching for the terminal gamma-ray flashes expected from evaporating primordial black holes.  As of Jan 1st, 2023, none have been detected.

Heavy-ion collider physics

If speculative large extra dimension theories are correct, then CERN's Large Hadron Collider may be able to create micro black holes and observe their evaporation. No such micro black hole has been observed at CERN.

Experimental
Under experimentally achievable conditions for gravitational systems, this effect is too small to be observed directly. It was predicted that Hawking radiation could be studied by analogy using sonic black holes, in which sound perturbations are analogous to light in a gravitational black hole and the flow of an approximately perfect fluid is analogous to gravity (see Analog models of gravity). Observations of Hawking radiation were reported, in sonic black holes employing Bose–Einstein condensates.

In September 2010 an experimental set-up created a laboratory "white hole event horizon" that the experimenters claimed was shown to radiate an optical analog to Hawking radiation. However, the results remain unverified and debatable, and its status as a genuine confirmation remains in doubt.

See also

 Black hole thermodynamics
 Black hole starship
 Blandford–Znajek process and Penrose process, other extractions of black-hole energy
 Gibbons–Hawking effect
 Thorne–Hawking–Preskill bet
 Unruh effect

References

Further reading

External links
 Hawking radiation calculator tool
 The case for mini black holes A. Barrau & J. Grain explain how the Hawking radiation could be detected at colliders

Black holes
Quantum field theory
Radiation
Astronomical hypotheses
Hypothetical processes
1974 introductions